The 2022 Oregon State Senate election were held in the U.S. state of Oregon on November 8, 2022, to elect 15 of the 30 members of the State Senate of the 82nd Oregon Legislature.

A primary election was held in several districts on May 17, 2022. The election coincided with the election of the other house of the Legislative Assembly, the Oregon House of Representatives, and other elections.

Background 
The last election in 2020 resulted in the Democratic Party retaining a majority of seats, after winning a majority and ending a split State Senate sixteen years earlier in the 2004 election. All-Democratic control of the legislature (and a state trifecta) has persisted since 2012.

Electoral system 
The 15 members of the Senate up for election were elected from single-member districts via first-past-the-post voting for four-year terms. 

Contested nominations of recognized major parties (Democratic and Republican) for each district were determined by a primary election on May 17, 2022.

Minor party candidates were nominated by petition. Write-in candidates must file a request with the Secretary of State's office for votes for them to be counted. Candidates for the state Senate in 2022 were required to file to run from September 10, 2021 to March 8, 2022.

Predictions

Overview

Summary by district

Close races
Districts where the margin of victory was under 10%:

Retiring incumbents

Democrats 
 District 6: Lee Beyer is retiring.
 District 11: Peter Courtney is retiring.
 District 16: Rachel Armitage is retiring.

Republicans 
 District 26: Chuck Thomsen is retiring.

Detailed results

District 3

Republican primary

General election

District 4

District 6

District 7

District 8

District 10

District 11

Republican primary

Democratic primary

General election

District 13

Democratic primary

General election

District 15

District 16

District 17

District 18 (special)

Democratic primary

General election

District 19

Republican primary

General election

District 20

Republican primary

General election

District 24

District 26

Republican primary

General election

Notes

References 

Oregon State Senate elections
Senate
Oregon Senate